The 1962–63 Drexel Dragons men's basketball team represented Drexel Institute of Technology during the 1962–63 men's basketball season. The Dragons, led by 11th year head coach Samuel Cozen, played their home games at Sayre High School and were members of the College–Southern division of the Middle Atlantic Conferences (MAC).

Roster

Schedule

|-
!colspan=9 style="background:#F8B800; color:#002663;"| Regular season
|-

|-
!colspan=9 style="background:#F8B800; color:#002663;"| 1963 Middle Atlantic Conference men's basketball tournament

References

Drexel Dragons men's basketball seasons
Drexel
1962 in sports in Pennsylvania
1963 in sports in Pennsylvania